Reinikka is a surname. Notable people with the surname include:

Aulis Reinikka (1915–1998), Finnish athlete
Ilmari Reinikka (1906–1978), Finnish athlete
Ollie Reinikka (1901–1962), Canadian ice hockey forward
Tyko Reinikka (1887–1964), Finnish bank director and politician